Anhalt-Bernburg-Schaumburg-Hoym (originally Anhalt-Zeitz-Hoym) was a German principality and member of the Holy Roman Empire. The death of Prince Victor Amadeus of Anhalt-Bernburg in 1718 resulted in the partition of his land, with his second son Prince Lebrecht inheriting what was originally known as Anhalt-Zeitz-Hoym.

The name of this principality was changed in 1727 from Anhalt-Zeitz-Hoym to Anhalt-Bernburg-Schaumburg-Hoym. The death of Prince Frederick on 24 December 1812 resulted in the extinction of the ruling house, and the territory was inherited by the Princes of Anhalt-Bernburg.

Princes of Anhalt-Zeitz-Hoym (1718–1727)
 Lebrecht 1718–1727
 Victor I Amadeus Adolph 1727

Principality changed its name to Anhalt-Bernburg-Schaumburg-Hoym

Princes of Anhalt-Bernburg-Schaumburg-Hoym (1727–1812)
 Victor I Amadeus Adolph 1727–1772
 Karl Louis 1772–1806
 Victor II Karl Frederick 1806–1812
 Frederick 1812

To Anhalt-Bernburg

References

1718 establishments in the Holy Roman Empire
1812 disestablishments in Europe
States and territories established in 1718
States and territories established in 1727
House of Ascania
Lists of princes
Former states and territories of Saxony-Anhalt
Principalities of the Holy Roman Empire